Weston Village may refer to one of the following places:

 Weston, Ontario, Canada
 Weston, Halton, England